{{speciesbox
| name = Lycodon bicolor
| image = Lycodon striatus.jpg
| genus = Lycodon
| species = bicolor
| authority = Contia bicolor-NIKOLSKY 1903
| synonyms = *Lycodon mackinnoni 
Ophites mackinnoni 
Lycodon mackinnoni 
Lycodon bicolor" 
| synonyms_ref = 
}}Lycodon mackinnoni/Himalayan wolf snake was considered as a species occuring in the Himalayan according to recent study Lycodon mackinnoni is now synonymised with Lycodon bicolor,Bicoloured wolf snake.According to recent studies it is now considered as a synonym of newly described species Lycodon bicolor.Etymology
The specific name, mackinnoni, is in honor of naturalist Philip W. Mackinnon, who collected the type specimen "in his own garden at 6,100 ft" (1,900 m) from Mussoorie, India.Beolens, Bo; Watkins, Michael; Grayson, Michael (2011). The Eponym Dictionary of Reptiles. Baltimore: Johns Hopkins University Press. xiii + 296 pp. . (Lycodon mackinnoni, p. 165).

Geographic range
Lycodon bicolor is widely distributed from himalayan region of North India towards north through Nepal,Pakistan,Tajikistan, Turkmenistan and likely from North-eastern iran, Uzbekistan,Kazakhstan.

DescriptionL. mackinnoni is a small snake. Dorsally, it is brown, with a network of white lines. Ventrally, it is uniformly white, or white with brown-edged ventrals. The dorsal scales are smooth, and are arranged in 17 rows at midbody. The anal plate is divided.

ReproductionL. mackinnoni is oviparous.

Footnotes

Further reading
Lanza B (1999). "A new species of Lycodon from the Philippines, with a key to the genus (Reptilia: Serpentes: Colubridae)". Tropical Zoology 12: 89–104.
Smith MA (1943). The Fauna of British India, Ceylon and Burma, Including the Whole of the Indo-Chinese Sub-region. Reptilia and Amphibia. Vol. III.—Serpentes. London: Secretary of State for India. (Taylor and Francis, printers). xii + 583 pp. (Lycodon mackinnoni, p. 263).
Wall F (1906). "A New Himalayan Snake (Lycodon mackinnoni )". J. Bombay Nat. Hist. Soc. 17: 29–30.
Wall F (1923). "A Hand-list of the Snakes of the Indian Empire. Part 2". J. Bombay Nat. Hist. Soc. 29 (3): 598–632. (Ophites mackinnoni'', p. 614).

mackinnoni
Reptiles of Pakistan
Reptiles described in 1906

Reptiles of India